A list of films produced in Spain in 1961 (see 1961 in film).

1961

External links
 Spanish films of 1961 at the Internet Movie Database

1961
Spanish
Films